The Clinical Center of Vojvodina, commonly known as Provincial Hospital is a hospital providing tertiary level health care services for the population of Vojvodina, the northern province of Serbia. It is located in the capital of Vojvodina, in Novi Sad. The Clinical Center is also the single emergency centre and inpatient hospital for the population of the city of Novi Sad and the region of South Bačka.

The clinics and diagnostic centers within the Clinical Center also represent the main research and education facilities of the University of Novi Sad, Faculty of Medicine and provide specialist trainings for medical graduates.

History

The Great City Hospital was founded in 1909, and it was comprised departments of surgery, gynecology and obstetrics, dermatology and venereal, and internal and infectious diseases. Later, name of the hospital was changed into the Main Provincial Hospital, with around 400 beds. In 1977, the hospital became a teaching hospital, following the establishment of the Faculty of Medicine within the University of Novi Sad.

The present Clinical Center of Vojvodina was founded by the decision of the Government of Serbia in 1997.

As of 2017, the Clinical Center holds 1,425 hospital beds, and its staff of 2,738 includes 502 medical doctors, 5 pharmacists, 1,350 nurses and technicians, 34 allied health professionals, 182 administrative and 665 ancillary and maintenance workers.

See also
 Healthcare in Serbia
 List of hospitals in Serbia
 Sremska Kamenica Institute

References

External links
 Official website

Hospital buildings completed in 1909
Hospitals in Serbia
Medical education in Serbia
Teaching hospitals
University of Novi Sad
Hospitals established in 1909
Buildings and structures in Novi Sad
1909 establishments in Serbia